Rudolf Harmstorf (25 December 1922 – 26 February 2016) was a German sailor who competed in the 1968 Summer Olympics. Harmstorf died in Hamburg on 26 February 2016, at the age of 93.

References

External links
 

1922 births
2016 deaths
German male sailors (sport)
Olympic sailors of West Germany
Sailors at the 1968 Summer Olympics – 5.5 Metre